Un apprezzato professionista di sicuro avvenire ("One Appreciated Professional of Sure Future") is a 1971 Italian drama film written and directed by Giuseppe De Santis. It is his last film.

Plot 
A young lawyer who married for money the wealthy daughter of a speculator discovers, on his wedding night, his impotence. A priest and childhood friend, Don Marco, would apparently solve the situation but things will soon turn to tragedy.

Cast 
Lino Capolicchio: Vincenzo Arduni
Riccardo Cucciolla: Nicola Parella
Femi Benussi: Lucietta Arduni
Robert Hoffmann: Don Marco
Andrea Checchi: Vincenzo's Father
Yvonne Sanson:  Lucietta's Mother
Ivo Garrani:  Lucietta's Father
Massimo Serato: Monsignor 
Nino Vingelli: Maresciallo  
: Maria, wife of Nicola
Vittorio Duse: Marco's Father
: old woman in the bus
: sacristan Giacomo
Anna Maria Dossena: mother of don Marco
Sergio Serafini: city councilor
Stefania Fassio: girl in church
Bruno Degni: 
Giulio Massimini: 
Ugo Carboni: 
: 
Bianca Mallerini Zardini: 
Rory Criscuolo: 
Daniela De Simone: 
Cesare De Vita: 
: 
Letizia Lehir: 
Eugenio Galadini: 
: 
Gian Carlo Piacentini: 
Tony Ventura:

See also     
 List of Italian films of 1971

References

External links

1971 films
Italian drama films
1971 drama films
Films directed by Giuseppe De Santis
1970s Italian-language films
1970s Italian films